Aqra, properly ʿAqra, is a diocese of the Chaldean Catholic Church

Aqra may also refer to:

 Jebel Aqra (properly Jebel al-ʾAqraʿ), a mountain on the Turco-Syrian coast that was a center of pagan worship for millennia
 Aqrah (properly ʻAqra or Akrê), a city and district in Iraq

See also
Aakra or Åkra (disambiguation)
Accra, the capital of Ghana
Acra (disambiguation)
Acre (disambiguation)
Akra (disambiguation)
Akre (disambiguation)
AQRE or QRE - quantal response equilibrium, a solution concept in game theory